Venmurasu ( Veṇmuracu) is a Tamil novel by writer Jeyamohan.  A modern renarration of the Indian classical epic Mahabharatha, it is considered Jeyamohan's most ambitious work to date, with "a scope and scale that seeks to match the grandness of the epic itself." It is one of the longest novels ever published. Jeyamohan started writing the work in January 2014 and announced plans to write it every day over ten years. He completed Venmurasu in 2020, it spans 26 volumes and 26,000 pages.

Venmurasu was written as a series of books following the general linear style of the Mahabharatha. Completed in July 2020, twenty-six books have been published online. The novel has been published as both a Collectors edition and Paperback edition.

Background
Jeyamohan had been an avid reader of the Mahabharatha, the quintessential epic of India. In his childhood he had been fascinated by the Kathakali renderings of Mahabharatha stories, their expressive portrayals of characters like Duryodhana and the angst-ridden life of Karna making a deep impression on him. Far from being a simple tale of 'good vs evil', Mahabharatha opened up for him as a true classic with multi-dimensional characters, drama,  emotion, and a deep meditation on truth, philosophy, ideals, fate and the universe itself.

As he grew up and traveled the length and breadth of India, Jeyamohan saw and read the various adaptations of the Mahabharatha and its universal influence on the culture and language of India across all regions and languages. He delved deep into the work of Vyasa and followed the path of the epic as it was told and retold over the works of thousands of authors, singers, and performers into the twentieth century. The epic grew with him and helped him chart the path of his life as a writer. The Bhagavad Gita had a deep influence on his worldview and he continued to explore its meanings under Guru Nitya Chaitanya Yati.

In the late 1980s and 1990s, Jeyamohan wrote many short stories based on the Mahabharatha, including the Thisaigalin Naduve and Padma Vyugam. He later wrote a series of essays on the Gita on his website. Jeyamohan also continued to build upon decades of personal research for his ongoing work on Asokavanam.

On the night of Christmas 2013, Jeyamohan was conversing with his children on the classic drama of Mahabharatha, and his daughter Chaitanya requested him to write it all himself. With just an outline in his mind and trusting his instinct, Jeyamohan decided to start the immense project that would stretch over the next decade. For each novel, a new chapter is posted daily on his website.

Style

Jeyamohan has described Venmurasu as a modern novel based on the Mahabharatha, and not just a retelling of the story in modern idiom. Venmurasu is guided by the storyline of the epic and the dynamics of the Indian Puranic tradition, but as a work of literature composed in the twenty-first century, it assumes its own form and aesthetics that place it in a modern context. Nested storylines, intertextuality and fantasy woven with deep archetypes and allegory provide a distinctly post-modern texture to the novel which Jeyamohan prefers to term as 'Puranic Realism'.

Venmurasu approximately follows the Mahbharatha on a linear narrative, but the many episodes are distinctly non-linear. While the Mahabharatha is traditionally narrated as 18 Parvas, Venmurasu breaks it into a series of novels, each self-contained with a plot and storyline, but remaining inter-connected with each other. Stories that are mere bylines and footnotes in the traditional Mahabharatha assume giant proportions in Venmurasu, and become central to the plot development across generations. Over its course, Venmurasu taps into Vyasa's original work, the Srimad Bhagavata, the Devi Bhagavata and a variety of other folk sources from India and abroad.

Venmurasu is distinct in its approach to re-narrating the timeless epic. First, rather than a simple re-telling of Mahabharata, the author weaves Indian thought into the novel's narrative structure. By this, the philosophical, cultural, and geographic landscape of India during the time of Mahabharata gets deeply embedded into the novel. Second, unlike many other contemporary re-narrations of Mahabharata, Venmurasu does not attempt to simply invert, negate, or transgress the original story and the characters. Neither does it try to focus its attention on one particular character at the expense of other characters. Rather, the novel fills the narrative gaps and expands upon the original story through establishing intense dramatic moments and exploring the inner profile of various characters. For example, Vichitravirya — a minor character in the original narrative — is expanded upon in a full-blown manner. Third, Venmurasu's narration has the sensibilities of a contemporary novelist. The novel would resonate not just with the readers of Odyssey, Iliad, and Kamba Ramayana, or to those who like the works of Tolstoy, Dostoevsky, and Thomas Mann, but also to those who are fans of Gabriel Garcia Marquez and Roberto Bolaño.

For instance, in a nod to the great oral storytelling traditions of India, many of the stories in Venmurasu are narrated by Sūtas, the travelling bards. Through their words and trances, the characters assume mythical dimensions and find their place in the common dream of the author and the reader. In each of its books, Venmurasu adopts a distinctive genre and style that is based on the storyline. The imagery, symbolism and language varies as the plots sweep across the vastness of ancient India and follow multitudes of characters. It stitches together hundreds of myths and legends from the various Indian religions and traditions. But at its core, it retains the highest ideals and poetic vision of Vyasa, and the tremendous drama that makes it accessible to the common reader.

Theme

While conventional Mahabharata narratives have reduced it to the proverbial battle between good and evil, Venmurasu presents a multi-layered and complex re-narration. At the same time, it stays away from modern interpretations that focus narrowly on a few characters. As a modern epic, Venmurasu paints 'a canvas as big as time itself'.

Within the in-numerous folds of Mahabharathas drama, Jeyamohan finds scope to explore and describe the philosophical narrative of Indian thought. In his own words, Venmurasu "is a classical work that possesses density and depth, but leaves enough space for discerning readers to fill with their imagination".

Outline

Venmurasu is written as a series of books, each with its storyline and distinctive style.

 The first book, Mudharkanal (First Spark),, creates the bookends for Venmurasu as is. It starts with the story of Asthika and Vyasa as a prelude to Janamejaya's Sarpa yagna, and ends with the liberation of Daksha by Asthika. In between, Mudharkanal travels back generations in time and builds the story of Asthinapuri, Shantanu and his empress Satyavathi, Bheeshmar, Ambai, Shikhandi, Vichitraveeryan, Chitrangadan, Ambikai and Ambalikai.
 The second book, Mazhaippadal (Rain Song),, describes the stories of Ambikai and Ambalikai, their sons Dhritarashtran and Pandu, and then traces the rise of Gandhari and Kunti. The plot sweeps across Asthinapuri, the North-Western kingdom of Gandhara and the Yadava lands. Mazhaippadal is as much a story of the conflict between the adversarial communities and tribes of ancient India as the one between the women of Asthinapuri  - which ultimately develops into the great Bharata war.
 The third book, Vannakkadal (Ocean of Colors),, describes the childhood and youth of Kaurava and Pandava princes growing up together in Asthinapuri. Vannakadal also follows the backstory of Dronacharya and his becoming the Guru of Asthinapuri's princes. In parallel, the novel follows the journey of Ilanagan, a young bard from South India who travels towards Asthinapuri and encounters the many cultures and philosophies of the great land.
 The fourth book, Neelam (Blue),,is the story of Krishna and Radha. At once romantic and lyrical, it describes Krishna through Radha's eyes and develops the archetypes underlying the Advaita philosophies. Neelam also follows the story of Kamsa, who was slain by Krishna.
 The fifth book, Prayagai (Confluence),, is the story of Draupadi's birth, youth and marriage with the Pandavas. In parallel it describes the rise of Krishna and his city of Dwaraka.
 The sixth book, Venmugil Nagaram (The City of White Clouds),, describes the background stories that led to the development of Indrprastha, the city of Pandavas. Its axis is Draupadi, The novel begins with her coming to Asthinapuri as the Queen and ends at the point when she orders the Indraprastha to be built. The novel's main foreground characters are Bhurishravas and Satyaki. While they played minor parts in the Mahabharata, Venmugil Nagaram expands them in great detail. It describes their lands, their clans and their politics and through it all, the subtle depth of their relationship.
 The seventh book, Indraneelam (Blue Sapphire),, is the story of the love of Krishna's Eight wives and their marriage to him. The locus of the story is the Syamantaka gem, the proverbial carnival form of Krishna. It tempts and teases the psyche of everyone around Him, it originates and ends within Him. Most of the story is told as seen through the eyes of Dhrishtadyumnan, the prince of Panjala who visits Dwarakai and his friendship with Satyaki.
 The eighth book, Kaandepam (The Bow), is the story of Arjuna's travels during his exile from Indraprastha and his marriages. It is also the story of his inner travels as he stumbles through and understands his relationship to his queens and his bow. Kaandeepam weaves in the story of Arishtanemi (based on Jain Tirthankaras) and juxtaposes it against Arjuna's story. Arjuna discovers the courage of Non-violence and his own path as a Karma Yogi.
 The ninth book, Veiyon (The Sun),, is the story of Karna, the tragic first-born of Kunti. By this time, Karna has become the celebrated king of Anga and attained his own place in Duryodhanan's camp yet his heart is not at rest. The Kauravas are invited to the Indraprastha for the town consecration ceremony where Karna encounters Kunti's overtures. As incidents propel the worsening of the relationship between the cousins, Karna finds his own calling.
 The tenth book, Panniru Padaikkalam (Battlefield of Twelve Signs),, tells the story of the Rajasuya ritual held by Pandavas in Indraprastha and the incidents leading to Draupadi's arrival at Asthinapuri, Slayings of Jarasandhan and Sisupalan and Draupadi vastraharan.
 The eleventh book, Solvalarkaadu (Forest of Growing Words),, tells the story of Pandavas when in exile. Their travel to various philosophical schools and the discussion of different vedic topics are told.
 The twelfth book, Kiratham,, describes Arjuna's travels to gain weapons from Shiva and the Gods of the Directions. The novel which vividly describes Arjuna's adventures over the four Devas(Yama, Kubera, Varuna & Indra) and the final gaining of Pashupatastra from Shiva, also portrays the darker side and an inner turmoil of Krishna in parallel.
 The thirteenth book, Maamalar,, describes Bhima's travels to get the Kalyana Sauganthika flower for Draupadi. In parallel, stories of Devayani, Ashokasundari, Tara and Jayanthi are told. Meeting of Hanuman also told.
 The fourteenth book, Neerkkolam, describes Pandava's exile in Virata Kingdom. In parallel, Nala's story is also told.
 The fifteenth book, EzhuThazhal, describes the discussions before the war. Banasura's story told.
 The sixteenth book, Kuruthicharal, describes the events when Krishna meets Kauravas multiple times as ambassador.
 The seventeenth book, Imaikkanam, Explaining the various chapters of Bhagavad Gita in Novel form. Krishna is in Naimisaranya. Yama meets him by taking various forms (as Bhishma, Karna, Draupadi, Vidura, Yudhishthira, Arjuna & Vyasa) and asks doubts to him. Krishna clarifies by Bhagavad Gita.
 The eighteenth book, Senna Vengai, describes the preparation and starting of the Kurukshetra War
 The nineteenth book, Thisaither Vellam, describes the rise and till fall of the Bhishma in the Kurukshetra War (10 days).
 The twentieth book, Kaarkadal, describes Karna taking the place of Bhishma and the death of Abhimanyu, Kadothkaja and Dhronacharya
 The twenty-first book, Irutkani, describes Karna heading the Kaurava army until his death.
 The twenty-second book, Theein Edai, describes the end of Dhuriyodhana, end of war and killing of sons of Pandava's.
 The twenty-third book, Neerchudar, describes the funeral rituals for war died. Dual between Arjunan and Ashwathaman. The exile of Parents of Kauravas, Kunthi and Vidhurar.
 The twenty-fourth book, Kalittriyaanai Nirai, details the resurrection of Hastinapur under Pandava's rule and their undertaking of Ashvamedha yagna.
 The twenty-fifth book, Kalporusirunurai,  talks about the fall of Dvārakā. It paints the demolition of Dvārakā due to natural causes and insatiable ego and resulting arrogance of those who think they are the rightful rulers of the kingdom after several clashes between clans and war for the throne. It shows the Yadava's getting completely wiped out and the death of Krishna who detaches himself from all this.
 The twenty-sixth book, Muthalaavin, chronicles Pandava's ascent to heaven after the young Parikshit is given the throne with Yuyutsu managing the kingdom.

Development and release

Jeyamohan started writing Venmurasu in serialized form on his website with an episode being released every day. The illustrators Shanmugavel and Manikandan added a painting for each episode for the first four books of the series.

 Mudharkanal began on 1 January 2014 and was completed by mid-February 
 Mazhaippadal was completed by May 2014. 
 Vannakkadal ran from June to August 2014. 
 Neelam was published from August to September 2014
 Prayagai ran from October 2014 to January 2015
 Venmugil Nagaram was published online from February May 2015
 Indraneelam began on 1 June 2015 and ended by August 2015
 Kaandepam ran from September to November 2015
 Veiyon was published online from December 2015 to early March 2016
 Panniru Padaikkalam began from late March 2016 to June 2016
 SolvalarKaadu - Published online July 2016 to September 2016
 Kiratham - Published online from October 2016 to January 2017
 Maamalar - Published online from February 2017 to May 2017
 Neerkkolam - Published online from May 2017 to August 2017
 EzhuThazhal - Published online from September 2017 to December 2017
 Kuruthicharal - Published online from December 2017 to March 2017
 Imaikanam - Published online from March 2018 to May 2018
 Senna Vengai - Published online from June 2018 to August 2018
 Thisai ther Vellam - Published online from September 2018 to November 2018
 Kaar kadal - Published online from December 2018 to March 2019
 IrutKani - Published online from April 2019 to June 2019
 Theeyin edai - Published online from July 2019 to August 2019
 Neerchudar - Published online from Sept 2019 to Nov 2019
 Kalittriyaanai Nirai - Published online from Dec 2019 to Feb 2020 
 Kalporusirunurai - Published online from March 2020 to June 2020  
 Muthalaavin''' - Published online from July 2020 to July 2020  
Once each book was completed, it was published in book form in limited hardback Collector's editions and also as paperbacks. Limited numbers of pre-orders of the Collector's edition carried the author's personalized signature. Natrinai Pathippagam, the Chennai-based publishing house, published the series up to Prayaagai. Kizhakku Publications, the imprint of NHM, has published the series beginning from Venmugil Nagaram.

The Vishnupuram Ilakkiya Vattam held a major release event in Chennai on 9 November 2014 for the Venmurasu series of books. The event hosted luminaries of Tamil art world including Ashokamitran, Ilayaraja, Kamal Haasan, Prapanchan, Nanjil Nadan, P. A. Krishnan and felicitated exponents of the traditional folk art forms and kathaprasangis of Mahabharatha.

ReceptionVenmurasu has met with good response among readers of Tamil literature across the world. Noted writers Indira Parthasarathy and A Muttulingam have praised Venmurasu for its intricate descriptions, poetic depth and classic dynamics. Writer and orator Marabinmaindan Muthiah has written a series of essays titled 'Vyasa Manam' introducing the finer aspects of Venmurasu''. Filmmakers Mani Ratnam, Vasanthabalan, Mysskin and Seenu Ramasamy have expressed their appreciation of the lyrical beauty and visuals. Critic and reviewer Suresh Venkatadri writes a series of reviews on Venmurasu at the online magazine Solvanam. Suresh Venkatadri also wrote a comparative review of Neelam and Krishna Krishna by Indira Parthasarathy. Editor and critic K N Sivaraman of Tamil magazine Kungumam called Venmurasu "a world class achievement".

In October 2021, US-based music composer Rajan Somasundaram and Vishnpuram Literary Circle USA produced a music album and soundtrack A Musical Tribute to Venmurasu (album), with performances by Indian film star Kamal Haasan, and singers Sriram Parthasarthy, Saindhavi Prakash. The album was released in an online event by film director Mani Ratnam and attended by film director Vasanthabalan, senior Tamil literary writers A Muttulingam and Nanjilnadan, critic Ravi Subramanian and poet Venu Thayanithy.

See also
 Kirātārjunīya
 Astra (weapon)
 Vedanta
 Mīmāṃsā
 Charvaka
 Usha Parinayam

References

External links
 Jeyamohan website
 Venmurasu website
 Illustrator Shanmugavel's website
 Venmurasu discussions forum
  Venmurasu Reader group

2014 Indian novels
2015 Indian novels
2016 Indian novels
2017 Indian novels
2018 Indian novels
Novels based on the Mahabharata
Tamil novels